Prior to 1946 the New Zealand armed forces received honours of the United Kingdom, including military decorations and campaign medals.  Since the end of World War 2 there have been constant moves towards an independent New Zealand honours system.  This has resulted in a new system of New Zealand honours, gallantry and bravery awards, and campaign medals.

The following are a list, in order of precedence as defined in references below. Those campaign medals which have been independently issued by New Zealand to its armed forces are in bold.

19th century
  New Zealand War Medal

South African War
 Queen's South Africa Medal
 King's South Africa Medal

World War I
  1914 Star
  1914–15 Star
  British War Medal
  Mercantile Marine War Medal
  Victory Medal

World War II
  1939–1945 Star
  Atlantic Star
  Air Crew Europe Star
  Africa Star
  Pacific Star
  Burma Star
  Italy Star
  France and Germany Star
  Defence Medal
  War Medal 1939–1945
  New Zealand War Service Medal

Post World War II
  New Zealand Operational Service Medal
  New Zealand Service Medal 1946–1949
  Korea Medal
  Naval General Service Medal (1915)
  General Service Medal 1918–62
  General Service Medal 1962
  Vietnam Medal
 Rhodesia Medal
 New Zealand General Service Medal 1992 (Warlike)
 New Zealand General Service Medal 1992 (Non-Warlike)
East Timor Medal

21st century
  NZGSM 2002 (Solomon Islands)
  NZGSM 2002 (Afghanistan) – Primary Operations Area
  NZGSM 2002 (Afghanistan) – Secondary Operations Area
  NZGSM 2002 (Iraq 2003)
  NZGSM 2002 (Timor-Leste)
  NZGSM 2002 (Korea)
  NZGSM 2002 (Counter-Piracy)
  NZGSM 2002 (Iraq 2015)
  NZGSM 2002 (Greater Middle East)

New Zealand Special Service Medals 
  New Zealand Special Service Medal (Nuclear Testing)
  New Zealand Special Service Medal (Erebus)
  New Zealand Special Service Medal (Asian Tsunami)

See also
 New Zealand Honours Order of Precedence
 Orders, decorations, and medals of New Zealand
 New Zealand gallantry awards
 New Zealand bravery awards

References

External links
NZDF Order of Wear
New Zealand Defence Force – Campaign medals information page